Curd, also dahi, is a traditional yogurt or fermented milk product, originating from the Indian subcontinent, usually prepared from cow's milk, and sometimes buffalo milk, or goat milk. It is popular throughout the Indian subcontinent. The word curd is  used in Indian English to refer to (naturally probiotic) homemade yogurt, while the term yogurt refers to the pasteurized commercial variety known as heat treated fermented milk.

Preparation
Curd is made by bacterial fermentation of milk. In this process lactose in milk is converted into lactic acid by several probiotic microorganisms. The species involved in the fermentation depends on the temperature and humidity of the environment, and may include Lactococcus lactis, Streptococcus diacetylactis, Streptococcus cremoris, Lactobacillus delbrueckii subsp. bulgaricus and Streptococcus thermophilus.

Curd starter is sometimes made with dried red chillies (or their stems) in hot milk. Milk is boiled and then allowed to cool for a while. When lukewarm, dried chili peppers or their stems are added. The reason for this tradition is that dried chillies are rich in a type of lactobacilli, the bacteria that helps in fermentation of milk to form curd. The bowl is then kept undisturbed in a warm place for 5 to 10 hours.

After the starter is made, or saved from a previous batch of curd, milk is boiled and cooled. In a separate bowl curd is mixed with its whey, and then mixed together with the milk. It is then left to sit undisturbed for 5 to 10 hours.
For best results, add 3% skim milk powder. Premix 3% good curd in milk, then add to the rest. Keep at 40-45C, covered with cloth to avoid cooling. Put in fridge only when it's slightly sour. Avoid harmful bitter taste. Don't reuse bitter curd.
This practice can also be applied for making curd from milk substitutes, such as soy milk.

Types

Buffalo curd 
Buffalo curd ( mudavāpu meekiri) is a traditional type of yogurt prepared from water buffalo milk. It is popular throughout the Indian subcontinent. Buffalo milk is traditionally considered better for making yogurt than cow milk due to its higher fat content making a thicker yogurt mass. Buffalo curd is usually packaged in clay pots.

Buffalo curd is obtained by bacterial fermentation of buffalo milk. In this process lactose in buffalo milk is converted into lactic acid using several micro-organisms. The species involved in the fermentation are the same as above.

Buffalo milk has a higher amounts of protein, fat, lactose, minerals and vitamins than cow's milk.  Quality of the curd depends on the starter culture. Fermentation also develops the characteristic flavor and colour of the product.

Buffalo curd can be made in both traditional and industrial forms. Traditionally buffalo milk is filtered and boiled, the scum is removed and it is cooled to room temperature. A few spoonfuls of a previous batch of curd are added and it is then mixed well and poured into clay pots. These are sealed by wrapping a piece of paper over the pot and allowing it to stand for 12 hours.

Curd dishes

Curd is an important part of everyday diet in the Indian subcontinent, both in slow cooked food and fast food.

Slow (cooked) food
 Curd rice
 Dahi kadhi – curd curry
 Doi maach – fish in curd curry, Bengali dish
 Dahi baigan/Kathrikai thayir kothsu – Eggplant with curd, south Indian cuisine
 Kadhi bari – a curd curry popular in Northern India and Southern Nepal.
 Perugu Pachadi – curd-based dip,  Andhra dish
 Thepla – served with plain curd,  Gujrati dish

Fast food
 Dahi vada / Dahi bhalla – Vada soaked in curd
 Dahi chiura – curd mixed with chiura, sugar and/or seasonal fruits, a Nepalese/Bihari snack
 Lassi – curd mixed with water and sweetener, usually sugar or molasses.
 Chaas/Borhani - curd mixed with water and Sea salt, black salt or Himalayan salt. It is also known as buttermilk.
 Borhani - curd mixed with coriander and mint, Bangladeshi drink
 Papri chaat
 Dahi puri – variation of Panipuri, using curd instead of tamarind water
 Dahi bhelpuri – variation of bhelpuri, with curd on top
 Aloo tikki – plain curd is a side dish for aloo tikki
 Aloo paratha – plain curd is a side dish for aloo paratha
 Mishti doi – curd that is fermented after adding sweetener to milk, usually cane jaggery or date palm jaggery, a Bengali dessert.
 Raita – side dish for biryani
 Chukauni – a Nepalese side dish made up of curd and potatoes with spices

See also
 Curd rice
 Dadiah
 Dhau

References

External links

 How to make curd
 How to make curd
 Curd and treacle
 Curd pots

Yogurts
Bangladeshi desserts
Bengali desserts
Indian cuisine
Pakistani cuisine
Nepalese cuisine
Sri Lankan desserts and sweets
Fermented dairy products
Indian dairy products